Serhiy Oleksandrovych Mishchenko — former president of the National Fencing Federation of Ukraine (1993 - 2012), honorary member of the National Olympic Committee of Ukraine, founder and member of the board (until 2010) of the All-Ukrainian Association of Automobile Importers and Dealers, member of the Competitiveness Council of Ukraine, chairman of  «ILTA LLC» - the official importer of Peugeot, Citroën and DS Automobiles in Ukraine.

Serhiy Mishchenko has a PhD in economics, and is an author of 20 publications on international statistics, world trade, development of scientific and technical potential.

Biography 
In 1978, he graduated with honors from the Faculty of International Economic Relations of Taras Shevchenko National University of Kyiv. In 1987 he defended his PhD thesis on the topic: "Statistics of world trade in agricultural and food products".

In 1978-1980 worked as a translator in the staff of the counselor of the USSR Embassy in the People's Democratic Republic of Yemen.

From 1980 until 1982 — economist at the Institute of Socio-Economic Problems of Foreign Countries of the National Academy of Sciences of Ukraine. After completing postgraduate studies at the Institute of Economics of the National Academy of Sciences, he was a junior researcher at the Council for the Study of Productive Forces of the Ukrainian SSR (1985-1986). During 1986-1990 held the positions of a researcher, a senior researcher at the Center for Scientific and Technical Potential Research of the National Academy of Sciences of Ukraine.

Deputy director (1990–1991) of the cooperative enterprise "Business" - Center for the analysis of business activity and market research. The main direction of the enterprise's work was the retraining of personnel in the field of foreign economic activity. 

In 1991, he headed the branch of Ilta Trade Finance, which was later reorganized into ILTA LLC. The enterprise became the center of development of various directions of business of the "ILTA" group. Today ILTA LLC is the official dealer of Peugeot, Citroen and DS in Ukraine. 24% of all Peugeot cars in Ukraine were sold in ILTA's centers. 

Serhiy is also a founder and member of the board (until 2010) of the All-Ukrainian Association of Automobile Importers and Dealers (VAAID), member of the Board of Directors (until 2020) of the Ukrainian Association of Lessors (UAL). Member of the board of the Charitable Foundation of Andrew the Apostle, member of the Competitiveness Council of Ukraine. Vice-president of the "Rivnenske Zemlyatstvo" NGO.

Sport management 
President (1993–2012), vice-president (from 2012 to the present) of the National Fencing Federation of Ukraine. 

Deputy head of the organizing committee for the preparation and holding of the 2008 European Fencing Championship in Kyiv. Honorary member of the National Olympic Committee of Ukraine.

References

External links 
 https://zakon.rada.gov.ua/laws/show/500/2012#Text
 https://www.president.gov.ua/documents/10552004-1872
 https://www.president.gov.ua/documents/8042008-7902
 http://www.mukachevo.net/ua/news/view/46297

Ukrainian government officials
1956 births
Living people